Drakes Creek is a stream in Warren County, Kentucky, in the United States. It is a tributary of the Barren River. Drakes Creek, as measured at Alvaton, has a mean annual discharge of 768 cubic feet per second. Drakes Creek was named for a white pioneer named Drake who narrowly escaped with his life an attack by Indians. The Shaker community of South Union, Kentucky, attempted a settlement along the creek, some 16 miles from their main village, in 1817, but the effort was abandoned in 1829.

See also
List of rivers of Kentucky

References

Rivers of Warren County, Kentucky
Rivers of Kentucky
Barren River